Joseph Emelien Patrick Poulin (born April 23, 1973) is a Canadian former professional ice hockey player who played 634 games in the National Hockey League between 1991 and 2002.

Biography
Poulin was born in Vanier, Quebec. As a youth, he played in four consecutive Quebec International Pee-Wee Hockey Tournaments from 1984 to 1987, with the Quebec Fleur-de-lis minor ice hockey team.

He played for the Hartford Whalers, Chicago Blackhawks, Tampa Bay Lightning and Montreal Canadiens after being selected ninth overall in the 1991 NHL Entry Draft from the Saint-Hyacinthe Laser.

Poulin's son, Samuel, was chosen 21st overall by the Pittsburgh Penguins in the 2019 NHL Entry Draft.

Career statistics

Regular season and playoffs

International

References

External links

1973 births
Living people
Chicago Blackhawks players
Hartford Whalers draft picks
Hartford Whalers players
Indianapolis Ice players
Montreal Canadiens players
National Hockey League first-round draft picks
Quebec Citadelles players
Saint-Hyacinthe Laser players
Springfield Indians players
Ice hockey people from Quebec City
Tampa Bay Lightning players
Canadian ice hockey centres